3 Lugares Diferentes (Portuguese for 3 Different Places) is the third studio album by Brazilian post-punk band Fellini. It was released in 1987, and was their last album to be released under the Baratos Afins imprint. Fans (and as well as Cadão Volpato himself) consider this to be Fellini's best album. It was also re-released in CD form in 1995 (like the two previous Fellini albums).

Although Ricardo Salvagni returned to Fellini in this album (both him and guitarist Jair Marcos were absent from the band during the recording of the previous album), Jair Marcos did not, and thus was temporarily replaced by Thomas Pappon's brother Tancred.

Original founding Fellini member Minho K. (real name: Celso Pucci) provides some backing vocals in this album.

The track "Pai" opens with excerpts of narration by famous English disc-jockey John Peel.

Track listing

Notes
 "Teu Inglês" is also present in the compilation Não Wave, alongside another Fellini track, "Funziona Senza Vapore".
 "Zum Zum Zum Zazoeira" is also present in the compilation The Sexual Life of the Savages, alongside another Fellini track, "Rock Europeu".
 The live bonus tracks of the CD re-release were recorded in 1988, during a show that celebrated the 10-year anniversary of their record label, Baratos Afins.

Personnel
Fellini
 Thomas Pappon — guitar
 Cadão Volpato — vocals, harmonica
 Ricardo Salvagni — keyboards

Additional personnel
 Tancred Pappon — guitar (on tracks 2, 8, 10)
 Silvano Michelino — percussion (on tracks 4, 5, 9)
 Minho K. — backing vocals (on track 4)
 Sweet Walter — backing vocals (on track 4)

Miscellaneous staff
 Recorded on January 87 in audio design a studio port of 4 channels Tancred Pappon except (track 7) recorded on August 86 in Mitzu's Toilet
 Mixed at Viceversa (sound engineer: Nico Bloise) and the Corda Toda (sound engineer: Paulé)
 Tapes — sugar blue, axel sommerfeld, john peel and osmar santos
 Fellini and Sweet Walter — cover (final art)
 Signore Volpato — drawing
 Fellini — arrangements
 Luiz Carlos Calanca and Fellini — production
 Luiz Carlos Calanca and Paulo Torres — remastering (cd version)
 Thank you again, tancred and thank you beto again
 One production Baratos Afins

References

External links
 3 Lugares Diferentes at Fellini's official Bandcamp
 3 Lugares Diferentes at Deezer
 Fellini on Baratos Afins' website  
 3 Lugares Diferentes at Discogs
 3 Lugares Diferentes at Rate Your Music
 3 Lugares Diferentes at MusicBrainz

1987 albums
Fellini (band) albums
Portuguese-language albums